Soldier Idumota (Yoruba: Sojadumota) sometimes called Unknown Soldier, is a cenotaph located in Idumota, a suburb of Lagos, in Lagos State, Nigeria. It was built and erected in 1948 by the Nigerian government to commemorate the soldiers who died during World War I and World War II.

References

Outdoor sculptures in Lagos
Tombs of Unknown Soldiers
Monuments and memorials in Lagos